Israel Juarbe (born March 1, 1963) is an actor most well known for portraying as Jose Martinez in Angels in the Outfield, Freddy Fernandez in The Karate Kid and The Net (1995). He appeared in the Sliders episode (5/15) "To Catch a Slide" (1999).

Filmography

References

External links
 

1963 births
American male film actors
American male television actors
Living people